Marcus Beach Campbell (November 18, 1866 – August 3, 1944) was a United States district judge of the United States District Court for the Eastern District of New York.

Education and career

Born in Newark, New Jersey, Campbell earned his Bachelor of Laws from New York University School of Law. He was a Judge of the Kings County Court in New York from 1918 to 1923.

Federal judicial service

Campbell was nominated by President Warren G. Harding on December 28, 1922, to the United States District Court for the Eastern District of New York, to a new seat authorized by 42 Stat. 837. He was confirmed by the United States Senate on January 3, 1923, and received his commission the same day. His service terminated on August 3, 1944, due to his death in Brooklyn, New York.

References

Sources
 

1866 births
1944 deaths
Judges of the United States District Court for the Eastern District of New York
Lawyers from Newark, New Jersey
United States district court judges appointed by Warren G. Harding
20th-century American judges
New York University School of Law alumni